A leaf gap is a space in the stem of a plant through which the leaf grows.  The leaf is connected to the stem by the leaf trace, which grows through the leaf gap.  

The leaf gap is a break in the vascular tissue of a stem above the point of attachment of a leaf trace.  It exists in the nodal region of the stem as a "gap in the continuity of the primary vascular cylinder above the level where a leaf trace diverges toward a leaf.  This gap is filled with parenchyma tissue".

References

Plant physiology
Plant anatomy
Leaves